Muhammad Hamidullah Khan, TJ, Sitara-e-Harb, BP (11 September 1938 – 30 December 2011) was a military leader in two wars fought in South Asia: the Indo-Pakistani War of 1965 and the Bangladesh Independence War in 1971.

Career

During the 1965 Indo-Pakistan War, Hamidullah was awarded the Tamgha-i-Jurat Gallantry Medal for his courage and Sitara-e-Harb War Medal for his dedication in the September 1965 Pathankot infiltration. In the Bangladesh Independence War in 1971, he planned and commanded the Chilmari riverborne amphibious raid, one of the most strategically significant ground combat operation that was fought during the War of Independence of Bangladesh within the Mankachar sub~sector boundary of BDF Sector 11.

During the war in 1971, he held three posts. As an official of the Bangladesh Government, M. Hamidullah Khan was the Principal BDF Representative of Guerilla Training at Chakulia, Bihar. After participating in the Sector Commanders Conference held between July 11~17th 1971, BDF C-in-C Colonel M. A. G. Osmani transferred Hamidullah to Teldhala, BDF Sector 11 HQ. During that time he received a battlefield promotion to Squadron Leader. Bangladesh Forces Sector 11 headquarters was under the command of BDF Commander Lt. Col. Ziaur Rahman, who appointed Hamidullah BDF Commander of Mankachar Sub-Sector 1, with additional charge of independent Roumari district. On 3 November 1971, Sqn Ldr M. Hamidullah Khan was appointed BDF Commander of Sector 11.

Hamidullah was the Bangladeshi representative during the 34th UNGA, United Nations General Assembly session in 1979 as Bangladesh Special Envoy on the question of granting recognition to the State of Palestine and the plenary session on UN Resolutions 242 and 439 on the question of Palestine and Namibia respectively. He held numerous public appointments and elected posts during his service to the country. Upon his death President of Bangladesh Zillur Rahman and Prime Minister Sheikh Hasina gave M. Hamidullah Khan a state funeral with full military honors.

He also authored four more books and made two documentaries on the events surrounding the war and post-independence. The Bangladesh Government named Road 23 in the town of Banani, Dhaka after him. Along with those of 55 other fighters, his biography was included in a CD released by the Bangladesh government.

Death

M. Hamidullah Khan was given a state funeral with a military guard of honour. Hamidullah Khan is survived by his spouse Rabeya Sulatna Khan and two sons, Murad Hamid Khan (Sonny) and Tariq Hamid Khan (Konny).

References

External links

 

Bangladesh Air Force personnel
Bangladeshi politicians
1938 births
People from Bikrampur
2011 deaths
Mukti Bahini personnel
Recipients of the Bir Protik